is a Japanese stage and screen actor from Tochigi Prefecture.

Nakagawa was affiliated with the acting group D-BOYS, produced by Watanabe Entertainment. He joined D-BOYS on the group's second open audition in July 2005, receiving the Judge's Choice special award.

Acting career

Theatre
Mori no Maerchen, as Cain (2006)
Cooky Crown, as Tazawa Minoru (2007)
Out of Order (2007)
D-BOYS STAGE vol.1: Kanbai Onrei, as Takumi/Nagakura Shinpachi (2007)
Sukedachi (2007)
D-BOYS STAGE vol.2 (2008, in pre-production)

Television
Hanbun no Tsuki ga Noboru Sora live action, as Tamotsu Yamanishi (TV Tokyo, 2006)
DD-BOYS, as himself (TV Asahi, 2006)
Puzzle, as Kentaro Kamiya (TV Asahi, 2007)
Tsubasa no Oreta Tenchi Tachi 3 (Fuji TV, 2007)
Tadashii Ouji no Tsukuri Kata (TV Tokyo, 2008)
Kamen Rider W live action, as Shun Makura (TV Asahi, 2009)

Cinema
 Drift 5 (2008, in pre-production)

Voice acting
 Kemono no Gotoku Hisoyaka Ni: Kotodama Tsukai, as Shigyou (2007)

References

External links
Nakagawa's Official Website and Profile
Nakagawa's Official Blog
Nakagawa's Official Friendster Profile
D-BOYS Official Website
Wikipedia Japanese article on 中川真吾
Wikipedia Japanese article on D-BOYS

1983 births
Living people
Japanese male stage actors
Actors from Tochigi Prefecture